General elections were held in Saint Lucia on 18 September 1957. The result was a victory for the Saint Lucia Labour Party, which won seven of the eight seats. Voter turnout was 56.8%.

Results

References

Saint Lucia
Elections in Saint Lucia
1957 in Saint Lucia
British Windward Islands
September 1957 events in North America